Hulcote is a village and (as Holcot) a former civil parish, now in the parish of Hulcote and Salford, in the Central Bedfordshire district of the ceremonial county of Bedfordshire, England. In 1931 the parish had a population of 39.

Historically part of the Manshead hundred, some evidence has been found indicating possible Neolithic, New Stone Age and Roman settlement in the area. Hulcote Mill and Hulcote Manor (now private houses) are both mentioned in the Domesday Book.  However, it is known that Hulcote has been consistently occupied since the Dark Ages. Hulcote has a church called St Nicholas.

The ecclesiastical parishes of Hulcote and Salford were united in 1750. On 1 April 1933 the civil parish of "Holcot" was abolished and merged with Salford to form "Hulcote and Salford".

Today, Hulcote is located directly to the north of the M1 motorway, close to the border of the Milton Keynes borough in Buckinghamshire.

References

External links 

History of Hulcote

Villages in Bedfordshire
Former civil parishes in Bedfordshire
Central Bedfordshire District